Simon Archer (1956/1957 – September 1993) was a newspaper journalist, press officer, and a biographer of Gerry Anderson.

He spent four years with local newspapers as a journalist and later worked for Kodak Limited in the public relations division as a company press officer. During 1986, Archer made a Kodak book containing photographs taken by Dave Lee Travis. He later went to HBM Limited, where he specialized in PR consultancy. It was during 1990 that he interviewed Anderson for the Century 21 magazine. Later on, he started work on his book called Gerry Anderson: The Authorised Biography.

In September 1993, Archer became involved in an accident on the M25 and consequently died at the age of thirty-six—he was making a journey to Gerry and Mary Anderson with the first printed copies of a book of his called Fab Facts. Additionally, Archer's death meant that he failed to finish his manuscript for Gerry Anderson's biography.

References

1950s births
1993 deaths
British male journalists